Wakui (written: 涌井 or 和久井) is a Japanese surname. Notable people with the surname include:

, Japanese actress
, Japanese baseball player
, Japanese footballer
, Japanese judge

Japanese-language surnames